Mucophilus is a fungal genus in the Chytridiales of uncertain familial placement. A monotypic genus, it contains the single species Mucophilus cyprini, described from Germany by Marianne Plehn in 1920.

References

External links

Chytridiomycota genera
Monotypic fungi genera